Juan Vicente Aliaga (born 1959) is a Spanish art critic who has written widely on contemporary conceptual art as well as on gender and queer theory. In his pioneer 1997 book Identidad y diferencia: sobre la cultura gay en España, co-authored with José Miguel G. Cortés, he expressed criticism of the assimilationist strategies of mainstream LGBT+ associations in Spain, advocating instead for a politics of difference and the reappropriation of slurs like "marica" and "maricón", similarly to what happened with "queer" in English-speaking countries.

Publications

References 

1959 births
Gender studies academics
Queer theorists
Spanish queer theorists
Spanish art critics
Spanish art curators
Living people